The 1958 GP Ouest-France was the 22nd edition of the GP Ouest-France cycle race and was held on 26 August 1958. The race started and finished in Plouay. The race was won by Jean Gainche.

General classification

References

1958
1958 in road cycling
1958 in French sport